Gábor Simon is the name of:

 Gábor Simon (politician, 1964) (born 1964), Hungarian teacher and politician, member of the National Assembly from 2002 until resignation in February 2014
 Gábor Simon (politician, 1972) (born 1972), Hungarian jurist and politician, member of the National Assembly since 2002
 Gábor Simon, Hungarian record producer and DJ whose stage name is Jade